al-Heila is a Palestinian village located eight kilometers south of Hebron. The village is in the Hebron Governorate Southern West Bank. According to the Palestinian Central Bureau of Statistics, the village had a population of 1,277 in 2007. The primary health care facilities for the village are designated by the Ministry of Health as level 1.

Footnotes

External links
Welcome To al-Heila
Survey of Western Palestine, Map 21:    IAA, Wikimedia commons
 Al Heila Village (Fact Sheet), Applied Research Institute–Jerusalem, ARIJ
  Al Heila Village Profile, ARIJ
 Al Heila Village Area Photo, ARIJ
The priorities and needs for development in Al Heila village based on the community and local authorities’ assessment, ARIJ

Villages in the West Bank
Hebron Governorate
Municipalities of the State of Palestine